Clayton Jacobson may refer to:

 Clayton Jacobson II (1933–2022), American credited with inventing the personal water craft
 Clayton Jacobson (director) (born 1963), Australian film director